Ján Sokol (born 9 October 1933) is a Slovak archbishop and former Archbishop of Trnava.

Life
Sokol was born in Jacovce, Topoľčany District. He studied at a grammar school in Topoľčany and studied theology and philosophy in Bratislava, before being ordained as a priest in 1957. He was subsequently a chaplain in Šurany (1957–58), Levice (1958–60), Bratislava-Nové Mesto (1960–66) and Štúrovo (1966–68). From 1968 to 1970 he was a prefect at a Catholic seminary in Bratislava, before working again as a chaplain in Sereď in 1970–71, and was a dean there until 1975.

He was appointed Apostolic Administrator of the Archdiocese of Trnava in 1987, and appointed as a titular bishop of Luni in May 1988 and consecrated bishop in June 1988 in the St. John the Baptist Cathedral in Trnava. He became Archbishop of Trnava in 1989.

On 14 February 2008, Pope Benedict XVI appointed him as the Archbishop of the newly created Archdiocese of Trnava, which remained an Archdiocesis despite no longer being metropolitan. In accordance with the canon law, upon reaching 75 years of age, he requested to be released from his office. Pope Benedict XVI named Róbert Bezák as his successor on 18 April 2009.

Controversy
Ján Sokol is listed as having cooperated with the former Communist Czechoslovak secret police, according to the documents from Ústav pamäti národa (ÚPN, Nation's Memory Institute), however, he denied any cooperation. He is also criticized for praising Jozef Tiso, the president of Slovakia from 1939 to 1945. Tiso's government was responsible for the deportation of Jews from Slovakia.

References

External links
Biography on the page of the Roman Catholic Church in Slovakia
Ján Sokol at catholic-hierarchy

1933 births
Living people
People from Topoľčany District
20th-century Roman Catholic archbishops in Slovakia
21st-century Roman Catholic archbishops in Slovakia
Slovak Roman Catholic archbishops